"Counting Stars" is a 2013 song by OneRepublic from their album Native.

Counting Stars may also refer to:

 The action creating star counts in astronomy

Books
 Counting Stars (Almond book), 2000 collection of semi-autobiographical stories by David Almond
 Counting Stars, 2007 romance novel by Michele Paige Holmes which won an LDS Whitney Award

Music
 Counting Stars (album), 2010 album by Andrew Peterson
 "Counting Stars", song by Michelle Malone from the 1987 album New Experience
 "Counting Stars", song by Sugarcult from the 2004 album Palm Trees and Power Lines
 "Counting Stars", song by Nujabes from the 2007 album Hydeout Productions 2nd Collection
 "Counting Stars", song by Augustana from the 2011 album Augustana
 "Counting Stars", song by Crossfaith from the 2013 album Apocalyze
 "Counting the Stars", 1958 song by Ladders
 Counting Stars (Be'O song)

See also
 "Just Counting Stars", 1961 song by Genie Pace
 Count Your Lucky Stars Records, Michigan independent record label
 Count the Stars, American punk band